Cornufer custos is a frog in the family Ceratobatrachidae.   Scientitsts know it exclusively from the type locality: Manus Island in Papua New Guinea.

Original description

References

Frogs of Asia
Endemic fauna of Papua New Guinea
Amphibians described in 2014
custos